The 2018–19 North West Counties Football League season (known as the Hallmark Security League for sponsorship reasons) was the 37th in the history of the North West Counties Football League, a football competition in England, and the first season following the split of the lower level into two geographically separated divisions. Teams were divided into three divisions: Premier Division, at Step 5, and Divisions One North and South, at Step 6.

The provisional club allocations for steps 5 and 6 were announced by the FA on 25 May. The constitution was ratified by the league at its AGM on 16 June.

Premier Division

At the end of the 2017–18 season, the following teams left the division:
 Promoted to Step 4
 Runcorn Linnets, to NPL Division One West
 Widnes, to NPL Division One West
 Relegated to Step 6
 AFC Darwen, to Division One North
 AFC Liverpool, to Division One North
 Barnton, to Division One South
 Maine Road, to Division One South

The remaining 17 teams, together with the following, formed the Premier Division for season 2018–19:
 Promoted from Step 6
 Silsden, from Division One
 Litherland REMYCA, from Division One
 Whitchurch Alport, from Division One

Premier Division table

Results

 Congleton Town v Padiham: match was abandoned at 65 minutes with the score at 3–0; result was allowed to stand

Stadia and locations

Division One
At the end of the 2017–18 season, the following teams left the division:
 Promoted to Step 5
 Silsden, to the Premier Division
 Litherland REMYCA, to the Premier Division
 Whitchurch Alport, to the Premier Division

The remaining 19 teams were split into the two new geographically separated divisions - Division One North and Division One South

Division One North

The newly formed Division One North consisted of 20 clubs:

 2 clubs relegated from 2017–18 Premier Division
 AFC Darwen
 AFC Liverpool

 10 clubs from the 2017–18 Division One
 AFC Blackpool
 Atherton Laburnum Rovers
 Bacup Borough
 Carlisle City
 Chadderton
 Daisy Hill
 Holker Old Boys
 Nelson
 Prestwich Heys
 St Helens Town

 8 clubs promoted from Step 7
 Ashton Town, from the Cheshire League
 Avro, from the Manchester League
 Cleator Moor Celtic, from the Wearside League
 Garstang, from the West Lancashire League
 Longridge Town, from the West Lancashire League
 Lower Breck, from the Liverpool County Premier League
 Shelley, from the West Yorkshire League
 Steeton, from the West Riding County Amateur League

Division One North table

Results

 Ashton Town v Cleator Moor Celtic: match was abandoned with the score at 1–1; result was allowed to stand

Stadia and locations

Division One South

The newly formed Division One South consisted of 20 clubs:

 2 clubs relegated from 2017–18 Premier Division
Barnton
Maine Road

 9 clubs from the 2017–18 Division One
 Abbey Hulton United
 Alsager Town
 Cammell Laird 1907
 Cheadle Town
 Eccleshall
 FC Oswestry Town
 New Mills
 Sandbach United
 Stockport Town

 7 clubs promoted from Step 7
 Cheadle Heath Nomads, from the Cheshire League
 Rylands, from the Cheshire League
 St Martins, from the West Midlands (Regional) League
 Stone Dominoes, from the Staffordshire County Senior League
 Vauxhall Motors, from the West Cheshire League
 Wythenshawe Amateurs, from the Manchester League
 Wythenshawe Town, from the Cheshire League

 2 clubs moved laterally from another Step 6 division
 Ellesmere Rangers, from the West Midlands (Regional) League
 Stone Old Alleynians, from the West Midlands (Regional) League

Division One South table

Results

 Abbey Hulton United v Wythenshawe Town: match cancelled due to "legal entity issues" Abbey Hulton United awarded a win and three points.

Stadia and locations

League Challenge Cup
Also called the Macron Challenge Cup for sponsorship reasons.
Source for this section: NWCFL web site

First round

† eliminated due to playing ineligible player

The following teams received byes to the second round:
 Atherton LR
 Barnoldswick Town
 Wythenshawe Amateurs
 Wythenshawe Town

Second round

† eliminated due to playing ineligible player
Abbey Hulton United received bye due to both Padiham and Shelley being eliminated in previous round

Third round

Quarter-finals

Semi-finals

First Leg

Second Leg

City of Liverpool won 6–2 on aggregate

1874 Northwich won 7–0 on aggregate

Final

Played at Altrincham's Moss Lane ground

Division One Trophy

First round

All the remaining Division One teams received a bye to the second round.

Second round

† Eliminated due to playing ineligible player

Third round

Quarter-finals

Semi-finals

First leg

Second leg

Avro won 5–1 on aggregate

Sandbach United won 9–3 on aggregate

Final

Played at Vauxhall Motors' ground

Division One Champions Cup

References

External links 
 nwcfl.com (The Official Website of The North West Counties Football League)

North West Counties Football League seasons
9